Ho Fuk Yan is a Chinese-language author and poet in Hong Kong.  Being the former Head of the Chinese Language Department of St. Paul's College, he also teaches Chinese History, Chinese Culture and Chinese Language before his retirement in 2010, after receiving his secondary education there and university education in The University of Hong Kong.

Ho's famous works include A Reborn Tree ("再生樹"), and "An Interview with the Dragon" ("龍的訪問").

References
The first 90 years, University of Hong Kong

External links
 文學花園：香港作家何福仁  

Hong Kong poets
Living people
Alumni of St. Paul's College, Hong Kong
Year of birth missing (living people)